A blanagram (from blank+anagram) is a word which is an anagram of another but for the substitution of a single letter.  The term has its origin in competitive Scrabble, where a blank tile on a player's rack may be used to form any of several possible words in conjunction with the player's other tiles.

Examples of blanagrams

On the list of currently acceptable words for club and tournament Scrabble in North America (OWL2), the anagram pair EPICOTYL/LIPOCYTE has 18 blanagrams:
Replacing C with L or N yields POLITELY or LINOTYPE;
Replacing I with A or F yields CALOTYPE or COPYLEFT;
Replacing L with C or D yields ECOTYPIC or COPYEDIT;
Replacing O with H or I yields PHYLETIC or PYELITIC;
Replacing P with R or V yields CRYOLITE or VELOCITY;
Replacing T with N yields POLYENIC;
Replacing Y with A, H, N, R, or U yields POETICAL, CHIPOTLE/HELICOPT, LEPTONIC, LEPROTIC/PETROLIC, or POULTICE.
Note that in this case no blanagram is available by replacing the E, so EPICOTYL and LIPOCYTE are the only eight-letter words that can be formed from the Scrabble tiles CILOPTY plus a blank.

The eight-letter word ANGRIEST (and anagrams such as GANTRIES and INGRATES) has over 100 blanagrams that are common words, and many more that are more obscure.
The word FILMCARD has only one acceptable blanagram: FLUIDRAM. (However, some other dictionaries list other possibilities, such as FRICADEL and FILECARD).
Turkish is a blanagram of Kurdish.
Pangram, Tangram and Managua are blanagrams of the word anagram.

Many seven- and eight-letter words, such as KILOVOLT and QUIXOTIC, have no acceptable blanagrams; such words typically contain a subset of the letters JKQVWXZ.

References

Scrabble
Word play